Bogart is a surname, derived from the Dutch surname “Bogaert” or “Bogaart”, archaic spellings of modern “boomgaard”, which means “orchard”. Notable people with the surname include:

 Bram Bogart (1921-2012), Dutch born Belgian painter
 Evan Bogart (born 1978), American music executive
 George Bogart (1933–2005), American painter
 Harriet Bogart (1917-1988), American painter  
 Henry Bogart (1729–1821), American surveyor and alderman
 Humphrey Bogart (1899–1957), American actor
 Jacob C. Bogart (c. 1820–?), ship captain and American Democratic politician
 John Bogart (1836–1920), New York State Engineer and Surveyor (1888-1891)
 Leo Bogart (1921–2005), American sociologist and media and marketing expert
 Neil Bogart (1943–1982), American music executive
 Paul Bogart (1919–2012), American television and film director
 William Henry Bogart (1810–1888), American author

See also
Bogaert
Bogarde
Boogaard
Van den Boogaard

References

Surnames of Dutch origin